St Ambrose's Church is in the village of Grindleton, which is situated about  northeast of Clitheroe, Lancashire, England. It is an active Anglican parish church in the deanery of Whalley, the archdeaconry of Blackburn, and the Diocese of Blackburn. Its benefice is united with that of St Peter and St Paul, Bolton by Bowland. The church is recorded in the National Heritage List for England as a designated Grade II listed building.

History
The west tower and part of the nave date from 1805. In 1897–98 the Lancaster architects Austin and Paley rebuilt the body of the church, other than its south side. That rebuilding also included replacement of the box pews and the pulpit.

Architecture
The church is constructed in sandstone and has slate roofs. Its plan consists of a three-bay nave, a north aisle, a south porch, a single-bay chancel, and a west tower. The tower is in three stages, with a lunette west window in the middle stage. The top stage contains lunette-shaped bell openings, and the parapet is battlemented with pinnacles at the corners. Each bay contains a two-light window. The south porch is constructed mainly of timber. Between the nave and the chancel is a buttress. The south wall of the chancel contains a three-light window, and the east window has four lights. The west window, and the windows along the north aisle, have two lights each.

Inside the church is a five-bay timber arcade. The chancel contains a double sedilia and a piscina. The stained glass in the east window dates from the late 1800s, and contains depictions of the Four Evangelists. Another window depicts Saint George and Joan of Arc, and beneath it is a memorial to the two world wars. The two-manual organ was built in 1879 by Bevington, and restored and overhauled in 1979 by R. D. Holmes and E. H. Holmes.

External features
The churchyard contains the war graves of three soldiers of World War I, and an airman of World War II.

See also

Listed buildings in Grindleton
List of ecclesiastical works by Austin and Paley (1895–1914)

References

Church of England church buildings in Lancashire
Diocese of Blackburn
Grade II listed churches in Lancashire
Gothic Revival church buildings in England
Gothic Revival architecture in Lancashire
Austin and Paley buildings
Ambrose, Grindleton